JDS Uniphase Corporation (JDSU) was an American company that designed and manufactured products for optical communications networks, communications test and measurement equipment, lasers, optical solutions for authentication and decorative applications, and other custom optics. It was headquartered in Milpitas, California. In August 2015, JDSU split into two different companies – Viavi Solutions and Lumentum Holdings.

History
Uniphase was started in 1979 in a San Jose, California garage, and made lasers for chip makers and scanners.

In 1981, JDS Optics was founded in Ottawa, Ontario by Philip Garel-Jones, Gary Duck, Jozef Straus, and Bill Sinclair.  The "JDS" is short for Jones, Duck and Straus/Sinclair. The company became JDS Fitel when it formed a partnership with Fitel, a fiber optic and optical connector company.

In 1999, JDSU was formed by the merger between JDS Fitel and Uniphase, and it became known as JDS Uniphase subsequent to the merger.

Three other major fiber companies were acquired by JDS Uniphase during the telecom boom – Optical Coating Laboratory Inc. (OCLI), bought for $6.2 billion and based in Santa Rosa, California, E-TEK Dynamics, bought for $15 billion, and SDL, bought for $45 billion, both based in San Jose, California.

In 2003, CEO Straus retired, and the company moved its headquarters to San Jose, California, to consolidate its business.

On August 3, 2005, the company acquired test and measurement equipment company Acterna for $760 million, which became part of JDSU's Test and Measurement Group.  Acterna had been formed by the May 2000 merger of network test solutions developer Wavetek Wandel Goltermann (WWG) and hand-held test equipment developer TTC.

In 2006, the company moved its headquarters to Milpitas, California.

In December 2013, the company announced it was acquiring fellow network performance management company Network Instruments, for $200 million.

On August 1, 2015 JDSU  split into Viavi Solutions and Lumentum Holdings Inc.

Stock
During the 1990s, JDS Uniphase stock was a high-flyer tech stock investor favorite. Its stock price doubled three times and three stock splits of 2:1 occurred roughly every 90 days during the last half of 1999 through early 2000, making millionaires of many employees who were stock option holders, and further enabling JDS Uniphase to go on an acquisition and merger binge. After a downturn in the telecom industry as part of the dot com bubble, JDS Uniphase announced in late July 2001 the largest (up to then) write-down of goodwill. Employment soon dropped as part of the Global Realignment Program from nearly 29,000 to approximately 5,300, many of its factories and facilities were closed around the world, and the stock price dropped from $153 per share to less than $2 per share.

On September 23, 2005, JDSU announced a reverse stock split one-to-eight.

Shareholder litigation
After the 2001 crash of the telecommunications industry, the state of Connecticut filed a lawsuit against the company and four key executives, claiming that they had misled and hid from company shareholders advance knowledge of the company's impending downturn. Unlike most similar lawsuits, which are dismissed or settled before trial, Connecticut's lawsuit went to trial in October, 2007. JDSU was acquitted of all charges in November, 2007.

References

Litigation references
Dan Levine. "JDS Uniphase Scores a Win in Securities Case," Law.com, November 28, 2007
Kevin M. Lacroix. “Defense Verdict in JDSU Securities Trial,” The D&O Diary, November 27, 2007
Stanford Law School Securities Class Action Clearinghouse, November 2007

External links
USA Today article about best and worst stocks of the George W. Bush presidency (JDSU last)

Companies based in Milpitas, California
Companies formerly listed on the Nasdaq
Electronics companies of the United States
American companies established in 1999
Optics manufacturing companies
Photonics companies
Electronics companies established in 1999
1999 establishments in California
American companies disestablished in 2015
Electronics companies disestablished in 2015
2015 disestablishments in California